Caçapava do Sul is a Brazilian municipality in the state of Rio Grande do Sul, located on the banks of the Camaquã River. As of 2020, the city has an estimated population of 33,548. It was the 2nd capital of the Piratini Republic from 1839 to 1840.

The economy depends primarily on the mining industry.  Caçapava do Sul produces 80% of the calcareous rock mined in Rio Grande do Sul. For many years it was Brazil's major producer of copper and is still an important center of copper mining.

A major deposit of copper ore was discovered in the 1940s by the CBC (Companhia Brasileira do Cobre / Brazilian Copper Company), under the direction of Brazilian industrialist and famous playboy Francisco "Baby" Pignatari. This large operation contributed enormously to the town's economy and is still the site of operating copper mines, by such companies as Majestic Diamonds & Metals.

The area has several interesting natural formations. Nearby lies Pedra do Segredo (Stone of the Secret), a natural outcropping of stone that attracts mountain climbers and tourists from all over the state and elsewhere.

Geography

Historic and natural sites

 Pedra do Segredo (Stone of the Secret)
 Dom Pedro II Fort
 Cascata do Salso (Salso Waterfall)
 Minas do Camaquã (Camaquã Mines)
 Casa de Borges de Medeiros (Borges of Medeiros' House)
 House of Ulhôa Cintra
 Parish Church of Our Lady of the Assumption
 Guaritas (considered the 7th natural wonder of Rio Grande do Sul)

Nearby Municipalities
São Sepé
Cachoeira do Sul
Santana da Boa Vista
Pinheiro Machado
Bagé
Lavras do Sul
Vila Nova do Sul

References

Municipalities in Rio Grande do Sul
Capitals of former nations